Abel Abelsøn (1252 – 2 April 1279), Lord of Langeland, was the third son of King Abel of Denmark, Duke of Schleswig, and younger brother of Valdemar III, Duke of Schleswig and Eric I, Duke of Schleswig. As a member of the ducal family, he held several fiefs in Southern Denmark.

Life
Abel was born in 1252 as the third and posthumous son of King Abel of Denmark, Duke of Schleswig, by his wife, Mechtild of Holstein. In the settlement with his brother Eric after the death of their elder brother Duke Valdemar III, Abel received the cities of Svendborg, Rudkøbing, and possibly also Faaborg on the island of Funen, and as a fief the island of Langeland. Abel died on Easter Day 1279 in Svendborg and was buried in Greyfriars’ Abbey.

At his death, he left only a daughter Margaret, who entered the convent of Zarrentin in Mecklenburg and donated her father's properties to her relatives, the counts of Holstein. They later sold it to King Eric VI of Denmark.

Marriage and issue
Abel appears to have married a daughter of Gunzelin III, Count of Schwerin:
 Margaret, abbess of Zarrentin. As abbess, she instituted a requiem mass for her father in 1317.

Ancestry

References
Biography in ''Dansk Biografisk Leksikon 1. ed.

House of Estridsen
1279 deaths
1252 births
13th-century Danish people
Sons of kings